Spanish Squash Federation ("Real Federación Española de Squash" in Spanish) is the National Organisation for Squash in Spain.

External links
 Official site

See also
 Spain men's national squash team
 Spain women's national squash team

Squash
National members of the World Squash Federation
Squash in Spain